WTBL-CD was a class A television station in Lenoir, North Carolina. It broadcast over-the-air on channel 49, and on cable channel 13 in the Lenoir area. It was an independent station with some programming from The Cowboy Channel. WTBL-CD was last owned by OTA Broadcasting, LLC, a company controlled by Michael Dell's MSD Capital. WLNN-CD in Boone provided its newscasts and other local programming for the station, and broadcast full-time on WTBL-CD's second digital subchannel.

On April 13, 2017, the FCC identified WTBL-CD will be compensated $8.2 million to go off-the-air as part of the spectrum auction. WTBL-CD ceased operations October 25, 2017; its license was surrendered on October 30.

History

As W53AO
WTBL-CD started as W53AO, on Channel 53. The station was mentioned in the April 1994 edition of Popular Communications magazine, in which it made mention of the station's attempt to be carried on the local cable television system.

Digital television

References

External links
 

Television channels and stations established in 1988
1988 establishments in North Carolina
Television channels and stations disestablished in 2017
2017 disestablishments in North Carolina
Low-power television stations in the United States
Defunct television stations in the United States
TBL-CD